David Hruška (born January 8, 1977) is a Czech professional ice hockey right winger for HC Stadion Cheb of the Czech 2.liga. He was selected by the Ottawa Senators in the 6th round (131st overall) of the 1995 NHL Entry Draft.

Hruška played 857 games in Czech Extraliga with VHK Vsetín, HC Slezan Opava, HC Karlovy Vary, HC Havířov Panthers, HC Litvínov, HC Slavia Praha and Piráti Chomutov.

Career statistics

Regular season and playoffs

International

References

External links

1977 births
Living people
HC Baník Sokolov players
Czech ice hockey right wingers
HC Havířov players
Sportovní Klub Kadaň players
HC Karlovy Vary players
EHC Kloten players
HC Litvínov players
Ottawa Senators draft picks
People from Sokolov
Piráti Chomutov players
Red Deer Rebels players
HC Slavia Praha players
HC Slezan Opava players
VHK Vsetín players
Sportspeople from the Karlovy Vary Region
Czech expatriate ice hockey players in Canada
Czech expatriate ice hockey players in Switzerland
Czech expatriate sportspeople in Austria
Expatriate ice hockey players in Austria